Giannis Balogiannis (born 27 January 1997) is a Greek professional footballer who plays as a winger for Super League 2 club Apollon Larissa.

References 

Greek footballers
1997 births
Living people
Association football wingers
Football League (Greece) players
Gamma Ethniki players
Super League Greece 2 players
Athlitiki Enosi Larissa F.C. players
Tilikratis F.C. players
Apollon Larissa F.C. players
Footballers from Larissa